The women's 800 metres at the 2014 IPC Athletics European Championships was held at the Swansea University Stadium from 18–23 August. Only final events were contested; no heat events were taken part.

Medalists

Results

T34
Final

T53
Final

T54
Final

See also
List of IPC world records in athletics

References

800 metres
2014 in women's athletics
800 metres at the World Para Athletics European Championships